Puhi o Aotea Ratahi (1898/1899–1966) was the fourth president of the Rātana  Established Church of New Zealand  and younger sister of the church's founder T. W. Ratana, the Mangai. She succeeded her nephew Matiu Ratana, the son of the Mangai in 1950 and served as president of the church till her sudden death in 1966.

References
Henderson, James Mcleod (1963). Ratana The Man, The Church, The Movement (1st ed.) A.H & A.W. Reed Ltd .

1898 births
1966 deaths
New Zealand Māori religious leaders
New Zealand Rātanas